Yaowapa Boorapolchai (born September 6, 1984 at Bangkok) is a Thai taekwondo athlete who was the bronze medalist in the women's under 49 kg event at the 2004 Summer Olympics. She graduate Bachelor of Arts Historical major from Thammasat University.

She started competing in 2002. In the first round of the Women's Under 49 kg event she defeated Brigitte Yague of Spain, and in the quarterfinal was defeated by Yanelis Yuliet Labrada Diaz of Cuba. She defeated Ivett Gonda of Canada and Gladys Alicia Mora Romero of Colombia in the repechage tournament to win the bronze and become the first Thai Olympic medalist outside of boxing and weightlifting.

She won a bronze medal in the Universiade, World Taekwondo Championships, and World Taekwondo Olympic Qualification Tournament in 2003, and a gold in the South East Asian Games in the same year.

Many Thais claim that Yaowapa, one of the most popular athletes among Thais, has frequently been victimized by wayward officiating. Besides her loss to Diaz in Athens, she also lost to Lim Su-Jeong, a Korean exponent, in a gold-medal match at the 2002 Asian Games in Busan, South Korea, and was defeated in the first round at the 2005 South East Asian Games in the Philippines by Loraine Lorelie Catalan, a Filipino exponent. Thai officials have claimed she was cheated by the judges in these matches, especially the matches involving exponents from the host nation.

External links
 
 
 

1984 births
Living people
Yaowapa Boorapolchai
Yaowapa Boorapolchai
Yaowapa Boorapolchai
Taekwondo practitioners at the 2004 Summer Olympics
Yaowapa Boorapolchai
Asian Games medalists in taekwondo
Olympic medalists in taekwondo
Yaowapa Boorapolchai
Yaowapa Boorapolchai
Yaowapa Boorapolchai
Taekwondo practitioners at the 2002 Asian Games
Taekwondo practitioners at the 2006 Asian Games
Yaowapa Boorapolchai
Medalists at the 2004 Summer Olympics
Yaowapa Boorapolchai
Universiade medalists in taekwondo
Medalists at the 2002 Asian Games
Medalists at the 2006 Asian Games
Yaowapa Boorapolchai
Yaowapa Boorapolchai
Competitors at the 2003 Southeast Asian Games
Southeast Asian Games medalists in taekwondo
Yaowapa Boorapolchai
Yaowapa Boorapolchai
World Taekwondo Championships medalists
Asian Taekwondo Championships medalists
Medalists at the 2003 Summer Universiade
Medalists at the 2005 Summer Universiade
Medalists at the 2007 Summer Universiade
Thai television personalities
Yaowapa Boorapolchai
Yaowapa Boorapolchai